John Robert Williamson (28 January 1887 – 1943) was an English professional footballer who played as a full-back for Sunderland.

References

1887 births
1943 deaths
Footballers from Gateshead
English footballers
Association football fullbacks
Aston Villa F.C. players
Stourbridge F.C. players
Gainsborough Trinity F.C. players
Sunderland A.F.C. players
English Football League players